was a Japanese politician, who served as a member of the House of Representatives and a governor of Saitama Prefecture.

In 1993 he received the highest distinction of the Scout Association of Japan, the Golden Pheasant Award.

References

External links

Scouting in Japan
1910 births
Governors of Saitama Prefecture
1996 deaths